Habib de las Salas de la Rosa (born 19 April 1987) is a Colombian Olympic weightlifter. He represented his country at the 2016 Summer Olympics.

He won the bronze medal in his event at the 2022 Pan American Weightlifting Championships held in Bogotá, Colombia. He won the silver medal in his event at the 2022 South American Games held in Asunción, Paraguay.

References 

1987 births
Living people
Colombian male weightlifters
Weightlifters at the 2016 Summer Olympics
Olympic weightlifters of Colombia
Pan American Games medalists in weightlifting
Pan American Games gold medalists for Colombia
Weightlifters at the 2015 Pan American Games
Medalists at the 2015 Pan American Games
Pan American Weightlifting Championships medalists
South American Games silver medalists for Colombia
South American Games medalists in weightlifting
Competitors at the 2022 South American Games
20th-century Colombian people
21st-century Colombian people